Bowling at the 2005 Southeast Asian Games took place in the Pearl Bowling Center in Parañaque, Metro Manila, Philippines.

Medal table

Medalists

Men

Women

External links
2005 Southeast Asian Games Official Results

2005 Southeast Asian Games events
Southeast Asian Games
2005
Ten-pin bowling in the Philippines